St. George, Florida may refer to:
St. George, Broward County, Florida, a former census-designated place, now a neighborhood of Lauderhill
St. George, Pinellas County, Florida, a place in Pinellas County, Florida
St. George Island (Florida) in Franklin County

See also
St. George, Georgia, located just across the St. Marys River from Florida